Faycal Rherras (born 7 April 1993) is a professional footballer who plays full-back. Born in Belgium, he represents Morocco at international level.

Club career
Rherras signed for Heart of Midlothian in June 2016. He scored his first goal for the club in a 3–3 draw with Inverness Caledonian Thistle on 29 October 2016. Rherras was released by Hearts during May 2017, then signed for KV Mechelen. He returned to Scottish football in January 2018, signing on loan for Hibernian.

On 15 July 2019, Rherras signed a two-year contract with Qarabağ FK. On 22 June 2020, Qarabağ announced that Rherras had left the club.

After a spell in Morocco, Rherras signed for 1,5 years with Levski Sofia in Bulgaria.

International career
He played for the Morocco national football team in a friendly match with Albania in August 2016, which ended in a goalless draw.

Career statistics

Honours

Club
Qarabağ
Azerbaijan Premier League (1): 2019–20

References

1993 births
Living people
Footballers from Liège
Citizens of Morocco through descent
Association football defenders
Moroccan footballers
Morocco international footballers
Morocco youth international footballers
Belgian footballers
Belgian sportspeople of Moroccan descent
AS Béziers (2007) players
Sint-Truidense V.V. players
K.V. Mechelen players
Hibernian F.C. players
Heart of Midlothian F.C. players
Qarabağ FK players
Belgian Pro League players
Challenger Pro League players
Scottish Professional Football League players
Ligue 2 players
Azerbaijan Premier League players
Moroccan expatriate footballers
Moroccan expatriate sportspeople in Scotland
Moroccan expatriate sportspeople in France
Moroccan expatriate sportspeople in Azerbaijan
Belgian expatriate footballers
Belgian expatriate sportspeople in Scotland
Belgian expatriate sportspeople in France
Belgian expatriate sportspeople in Azerbaijan
Expatriate footballers in Scotland
Expatriate footballers in Azerbaijan
2017 Africa Cup of Nations players